Leo Owen "Doc" Traister (September 9, 1919 – September 26, 2020) was an American football and basketball coach. He was the ninth head football coach at Eureka College in Eureka, Illinois, serving for 11 seasons, from 1956 until 1966, and compiling a record of 11–62–6. Traister was also the head basketball coach at Eureka for 17 seasons, from 1957 to 1974, tallying a mark of 168–195.

Traister was a World War II veteran. He died on September 26, 2020, in Eureka.

Head coaching record

College football

References

1919 births
2020 deaths
American centenarians
Eureka Red Devils athletic directors
Eureka Red Devils baseball players
Eureka Red Devils football coaches
Eureka Red Devils football players
Eureka Red Devils men's basketball coaches
College men's track and field athletes in the United States
High school basketball coaches in Illinois
High school football coaches in Illinois
High school track and field coaches in the United States
People from Sterling, Illinois
Coaches of American football from Illinois
Players of American football from Illinois
Baseball players from Illinois
Basketball coaches from Illinois
Track and field athletes from Illinois
Men centenarians